Buer is a spirit that appears in the 16th-century grimoire Pseudomonarchia Daemonum and its derivatives, where he is described as a Great President of Hell, having fifty legions of demons under his command. He appears when the Sun is in Sagittarius. Like Chiron, the chief centaur of Greek mythology, he teaches natural and moral philosophy, logic, and the qualities and uses of all herbs and plants, and is also capable of healing all infirmities (especially of humans) and bestows good familiars.

He has been described as being in the shape of Sagittarius, which is as a centaur with a bow and arrows. Additionally, Louis Le Breton created an illustration of Buer, later engraved by M. Jarrault, depicting the demon as having the head of a lion and five goat legs surrounding his body to walk in every direction.

In popular culture
 In the hit 2020 fighting game Guilty Gear Strive, Zato-1's jumping slash (j.s) is modeled after Louis Le Breton's illustration of the demon. However, instead of a lion's head, it is a large open mouth.
 In the video game Genshin Impact, "Buer" is the Goetic title given to Lesser Lord Kusanali, the Dendro (nature) Archon and God of Wisdom who rules over the nation of Sumeru. She currently resides in her vessel as Nahida.
 Buer appears as a minor enemy in several Castlevania games as well as the Castlevania TV series. It also appears in Bloodstained, the spiritual successor to Castlevania.
 Buer is a character in the animated series Rage of Bahamut.

See also

The Lesser Key of Solomon
Ixion, from Greek mythology, the father of the Centaurs who is bound to a winged fiery wheel by Zeus
Wanyūdō, a similar creature from Japanese mythology

References

Sources
S. L. MacGregor Mathers, A. Crowley, The Goetia: The Lesser Key of Solomon the King (1904). 1995 reprint: .

Goetic demons